Julián Miralles Rodríguez (born 16 November 1988 in Alberic, Spain) is a Spanish motorcycle racer. He is son of a former motorcycle racer, also named Julián Miralles. He currently competes in the RFME Open 1000 Championship, aboard a BMW S1000RR.

Career statistics

Grand Prix motorcycle racing

By season

Races by year
(key)

References

External links
  Profile on PiloteGPMoto.com 

1988 births
Living people
People from Ribera Alta (comarca)
Sportspeople from the Province of Valencia
Spanish motorcycle racers
125cc World Championship riders
Moto3 World Championship riders